Alone Together is an album by American singer Tony Bennett. It was originally released in 1961 on Columbia as CL 1471. It almost exclusively features string arrangements of standards, with a choir, harp accompaniment and sparse percussion in places. It is among the most obscure Bennett recordings. So far, it has been released on CD only in Japan by Sony/CBS.

Track listing
"Alone Together" (Arthur Schwartz, Howard Dietz) - 3:07
"This Is All I Ask" (Gordon Jenkins)- 4:12
"Out of This World" (Harold Arlen, Johnny Mercer) - 3:37
"Walk in the Country" (Bart Howard) - 3:46
"I'm Always Chasing Rainbows" (Harry Carroll, Joseph McCarthy) - 2:46
"Poor Butterfly" (Raymond Hubbell, John Golden) - 3:41
"After You've Gone" (Henry Creamer, Turner Layton) - 3:57
"Gone With the Wind" (Allie Wrubel, Herb Magidson) - 3:34
"It's Magic" (Sammy Cahn, Jule Styne) - 3:17
"How Long Has This Been Going On?" (George Gershwin, Ira Gershwin) - 3:52
"Sophisticated Lady" (Duke Ellington, Mitchell Parish, Irving Mills) - 3:00
"For Heaven's Sake" (Elise Bretton, Sherwin Edwards, Don Meyer)- 3:21

Recorded on February 28 (#1, 5, 11), February 29 (#6, 7-8, 10, 12) and March 1 (#2-4, 9), 1960.

Personnel
Tony Bennett – vocals
Frank DeVol - conductor, arranger
Unspecified string section

References

1960 albums
Tony Bennett albums
Albums conducted by Frank De Vol
Albums arranged by Frank De Vol
Columbia Records albums